DWFO (87.5 FM), broadcasting as 87.5 Republika FM1, is a radio station owned and operated by the Philippine Broadcasting Service, the broadcast arm of the Presidential Communications Group. Its studios and transmitter are located at the 4th Floor, Philippine Information Agency Building, Visayas Ave., Quezon City. The station operates on terrestrial radio Mondays to Saturdays from 5:00 AM to 12:00 MN and Sundays from 5:00 AM to 9:00 PM, while it operates 24 hours a day on its online platforms.

History

Prior history
Prior to the PBS's acquisition, the Kapisanan ng mga Brodkaster ng Pilipinas (KBP) asked the National Telecommunications Commission (NTC) to reserve the said frequency for local campuses (including Angelicum College, where they own the said frequency under the call letters DWAC-FM) due to multiple reports that some others will use the latter frequency for commercial purposes. Also, a few religious and community groups (such as Jehovah's Witnesses) operated the frequency with a low-powered signal enough to cover its main target area.

Acquisition by PBS
Radio veteran Rizal "Bong" Aportadera, Jr. (Sonny B) was appointed by Presidential Communications Operations Office (PCOO) Sec. Martin Andanar as the Director General of the Philippine Broadcasting Service (PBS) in July 2016.

In an official statement by Andanar, PBS acquired the 87.5 MHz frequency and was later approved by the NTC.

On November 1, 2017, FM1 began its test broadcast at 1:00 am. A few days later, the station's DJs (mostly former DJs of Mellow 947 and Tiger22's stations 99.5 Play FM, Wave 89.1, Jam 88.3, Magic 89.9 and 103.5 K-Lite) identified the frequency under the call sign DWFO, subject to approval from the NTC.

Since November 1, 2017, the station's initial 1 kW power increases in two phases: an increase to 10 kW by December 28, 2017, then upgraded to 25 kW (the maximum licensed nominal power for an FM station) on January 1, 2018. The power increase makes FM1 able to cover Mega Manila and some surrounding provinces, though the ERP power is currently not at par with FM2 as well as the orientation of the new antenna expected to adjust to provide stable coverage.

FM1 have bared plans for nationwide expansion by launching the first provincial stations, including FM1 Davao which was launched on August 1, 2018 (later moved to 87.9 MHz in Davao City, in February 2020), with plans of establishing more stations in Cebu, Cagayan de Oro, Bacolod, Iloilo, Baguio, Bohol, Boracay, General Santos, Laoag, Butuan, and Zamboanga.

On June 12, 2020, in the day of the Philippine independence at noon, FM1 enhanced its branding as REPUBLIKA FM1, with the slogan Radio Republic of the Youth. The rebranding comes about four months after its sister station FM2 was rebranded as Capital FM2. The rebranding went same for its station in Davao.

On November 14, 2020, FM1 launched Weekend Recovery Radio, a Saturday show that airs music from 3 to 10 years ago, replacing Sunday Y2K.

See also
 Radyo Pilipinas 1
 Radyo Pilipinas 2
 Radyo Pilipinas Worldwide
 104.3 FM2
 Philippine Broadcasting Service
 FM1 Davao

References

External links
 Official Website

Contemporary hit radio stations in the Philippines
Radio stations in Metro Manila
Radio stations established in 2017
Philippine Broadcasting Service
2017 establishments in the Philippines